André-Waclaw Krzatala (born 16 January 1990) is a German footballer who plays as a forward for Sportfreunde Larrelt.

References

External links
 Profile on FuPa.net

1990 births
Living people
German footballers
Association football forwards
Kickers Emden players
3. Liga players